Rasteh Kenar (also Romanized as Rāsteh Kenār; also known as Rāsteh Kenār-e Shījān) is a village in Chapar Khaneh Rural District, Khomam District, Rasht County, Gilan Province, Iran. At the 2006 census, its population was 1,076, in 309 families.

References 

Populated places in Rasht County